The 2020 TCR China season was the fourth season of the TCR's Chinese Touring Car Championship.

Teams and drivers

Calendar and results
The revised calendar was announced on 21 July 2020. Another revised calendar for the following rounds was announced on 20 October 2020.

Championship standings

Drivers' championship

Scoring systems

Teams' championship

Am Cup

References

External links 

 TCR China Series Official website

TCR China Series
China Touring Car Championship